Glipostenoda trichophora is a species of beetle in the genus Glipostenoda. It was described in 1951.

References

trichophora
Beetles described in 1951